William Francis Guest (8 February 1914 – 15 November 1994) was an English professional footballer who played as an outside left for Birmingham, Blackburn Rovers and Walsall in the Football League either side of the Second World War. During the war, he won a runners-up medal with Blackburn Rovers in the 1940 Football League War Cup Final. He went on to play for Peterborough United in the Midland League, for Kidderminster Harriers and Lovell's Athletic in the Southern League, and for Hinckley United and Bilston United.

During the war he was a guest-player for Lovell's Athletic, the works team for Lovell's sweet factory in Newport, Monmouthshire, Wales.

References

External links
Guest's Football League stats at Neil Brown's Post War Player Database. Note that Brown mistakenly includes data for a different William Guest who played for West Ham United in 1936.
Guest's Peterborough stats

1914 births
1994 deaths
People from Brierley Hill
English footballers
Association football outside forwards
Birmingham City F.C. players
Blackburn Rovers F.C. players
Walsall F.C. players
Peterborough United F.C. players
Kidderminster Harriers F.C. players
Lovell's Athletic F.C. players
Hinckley Athletic F.C. players
Bilston Town F.C. players
English Football League players
Midland Football League players
Southern Football League players
Lovell's Athletic F.C. wartime guest players